The Statute Law Revision (Substituted Enactments) Act 1876 (39 & 40 Vict c 20) is an Act of the Parliament of the United Kingdom.

This Act was repealed on 5 November 1993 by section 1(1) of, and Part IV of Schedule 1 to, the Statute Law (Repeals) Act 1993

This Act was repealed in relation to Northern Ireland by section 13 of, and Schedule 2 to, the Criminal Injuries to Persons (Compensation) Act (Northern Ireland) 1968 (c 9) (NI).

This Act was retained for the Republic of Ireland by section 2(2)(a) of, and Part 4 of Schedule 1 to, the Statute Law Revision Act 2007.

Section 1 - Substitution of Summary Jurisdiction Act for repealed Act 7 & 8 Geo 4 c 30 in certain sections of the Inclosure Acts
Immediately before its repeal, this section read:

The words at the beginning were repealed by the Statute Law Revision Act 1883. The words in the second and third places were repealed by the Statute Law Revision Act 1894. The words in the last place were repealed by section 46(2) of, and Part III of Schedule 7 to, the Justices of the Peace Act 1949.

Section 2
The first paragraph of this section was repealed by the Statute Law Revision Act 1883.

This section was repealed by the Statute Law Revision Act 1950.

Section 3
This section was repealed as to England and Ireland by section 48(1) of,  and the Schedule to, the Larceny Act 1916.

Section 4
The first paragraph of this section was repealed by the Statute Law Revision Act 1883.

This section was repealed by section 33(3) of, and Part II of Schedule 3 to, the Theft Act 1968.

Section 5
The first paragraph of this section was repealed by the Statute Law Revision Act 1883.

This section was repealed by Part IX of the Schedule to the Statute Law (Repeals) Act 1971.

Section 6
This section was repealed by the Statute Law Revision Act 1883.

Section 7
This section was repealed by the Statute Law Revision Act 1894.

Schedule
The Schedule was repealed by the Statute Law Revision Act 1894.

See also
Statute Law Revision Act.

References
Halsbury's Statutes,

External links
The Statute Law Revision (Substituted Enactments) Act 1876, as amended, from the National Archives.
The Statute Law Revision (Substituted Enactments) Act 1876, as at 1 February 1991, from the National Archives.
List of amendments and repeals in the Republic of Ireland from the Irish Statute Book.

United Kingdom Acts of Parliament 1876